The Admiral William Brown Cup (in ) is an international rugby union competition contested between  and . It was first held on 16 November 2012 at the Aviva Stadium. The trophy is named after Admiral William Brown, the Irish-Argentine who founded the Argentine Navy.

This competition was born after a joint initiative involving the  Embassy of Argentina in Dublin, the Embassy of Ireland in Buenos Aires, the Argentine Rugby Union and the Irish Rugby Football Union.

Statistics

Results 

 – Summer Test
 – Autumn International

See also
 History of rugby union matches between Argentina and Ireland

References

Rugby union international rivalry trophies
International rugby union competitions hosted by Ireland
International rugby union competitions hosted by Argentina
2012 establishments in Ireland
2012 establishments in Argentina
History of rugby union matches between Argentina and Ireland
Recurring sporting events established in 2012